António Sardinha (9 September 1887 in Monforte, Portalegre – 10 January 1925 in Elvas) was a Portuguese writer and the main intellectual behind the Integralismo Lusitano movement. He espoused a strongly conservative world view.

Early politics
Sardinha graduated in law from the University of Coimbra in 1911. During his student years, he was a supporter of Republicanism and even flirted with anarcho-syndicalism but by 1911 he had shifted his opinions, under the influence of his highly conservative mother and became a strong advocate of monarchism and Catholicism. He was also influenced in this regard by the Spanish conservative Juan Vázquez de Mella, who was a close friend of Sardinha from the early 1900s.

Integralism
He was the founder of Integralismo Lusitano in 1913 along with José Hipólito Raposo and Alberto de Monsaraz. He would serve as a deputy for a time under the Presidency of Sidónio Pais, who was vaguely sympathetic towards Integralism.

Sardinha was this group's foremost ideologue and his programme was outlined in his 1925 work, A Aliança Peninsular, which called for a regression in Iberia and a new Catholic corporatism that recalled the work of Charles Maurras. This highly nationalist and ruralist work was seen in Spain as the basis of Hispanidad. His writings revealed a strong affinity for the agricultural as a historical and economic basis as well as support for anti-Semitism. This anti-Semitism was influenced by Action Française, from whom he also took a strong strain of anti-liberalism. He added to this a hard-line racism in which he strongly criticised miscegnation although this element of his ideology was rejected by some within the movement, most notably José Hipólito Raposo. Further to this Sardinha also grafted elements of the works of Georges Sorel, adopting his theories of revolutionary validity and the social value of myth to his own ideology.

Under Sardinha's direction the movement converted from being a group of monarchist nostalgics into a coherent ideology that hoped to establish a new era in Portuguese history under the leadership of a strong centralised monarchy. Unlike some of his contemporaries Sardinha considered a close relationship to Spain to be of central importance for Portugal and he also took an internationalist view in general, hoping to see similar integralisms develop elsewhere, particularly in Brazil where that proved to be the case.

His early death in 1925 saw Integralismo Lusitano lose its most celebrated thinker and as a movement it failed to recover from the blow. Drawing from traditional monarchism, Hispanidad, ruralism, Integralism, scientific racism, fascism and national syndicalism he had created a complex syncretic ideology that inevitably fissured into various factions after his death.

Historian
As well as his political activism Sardinha was also noted as a somewhat controversial historian. Much of his work was given over to a historical revisionism that sought to counter liberal interpretations of history. Amongst his pet theories was that António de Araújo e Azevedo, 1st Count of Barca had collaborated with France during his time as Minister of Foreign Affairs during the Peninsular War. Similarly he rejected the widely celebrated Portuguese discoveries as ushering in an era of capitalism and cosmopolitanism and thus flying in the face of his ruralist ideals.

References

1887 births
1925 deaths
People from Monforte, Portugal
Integralismo Lusitano
20th-century Portuguese historians
University of Coimbra alumni
20th-century historians